Sebastiano Siviglia (born 29 March 1973) is an Italian football coach and a former player who played as a defender. Throughout his career, Siviglia played over 250 matches in the Italian Serie A for several clubs, in particular Lazio, where he made over 150 league appearances.

Playing career

Early career
Born in Palizzi, the Province of Reggio Calabria, Siviglia started his senior career at Audax Ravagnese, a Serie D club located in Ravagnese, Reggio Calabria, southern Italy. He then spent 3 seasons at Parma, located in Emilia–Romagna region, northern Italy.

Siviglia then moved to Serie D side Nocerina in 1993, which finished as runner-up with the Campania side in Group H and promoted to professional football (Serie C2, Italian fourth highest level). He won Serie C2 Group C Champion in 1995 and promoted again. Siviglia finished the third in Group B with Nocerina but lost to Ascoli in promotion playoffs first round (also semi-final).

Verona & Atalanta
In 1996, he was signed by Serie A side Verona. He played the first Serie A match on 22 September 1996 against Fiorentina as starter, which the Veneto side lost 0–2 to la viola. He played 30 league matches that season (all as starter), and followed the team relegated to Serie B. In 1998, he was signed by newly relegated league rival Atalanta, in exchange with Paolo Foglio, and won promotion back to Serie A in 2000 as the 4th. He finished seventh in 2000–01 Serie A season with the Lombardy side, but was provisionally banned 2 months for suspected match-fixing along with team-mate Fabio Gallo and Luciano Zauri. The ban cleared in May 2001. Siviglia returned to squad on 13 May, against Roma, which lost 0–1 away at Stadio Olimpico. Roma maintained 5 points lead that round (round 30) and ultimately won the Scudetto.

Roma and return to Parma
On 19 May 2001, Roma agreed to sign Siviglia which Siviglia's contract was reported would expire on 30 June and announced officially on 6 July But he failed to play regularly; he played five league matches under Fabio Capello, as the club had internationals players Cafu, Aldair, Walter Samuel, Zago, Christian Panucci, Vincent Candela and Jonathan Zebina. He made his UEFA Champions League debut there, on 30 October 2001 against R.S.C. Anderlecht, as starting XI along with Cafu, Aldair and Samuel.

On 30 June 2002, the last day of the 2001–02 fiscal year, he was re-signed by Parma in exchange with Luigi Sartor. Sartor was priced €9.5 million and Siviglia priced €9 million. Roma also swapped their backup players and even youth players for inflated price with other clubs, in order to gain false "profit". As both club got value added on the players they sell, which gave "profit" by selling players, but they were false "profit" because they turned all the revenue they sell to buy registration rights from opposite side also with inflated price, but as the cost was amortized proportionally during the player contract (usually multi-year), which still appeared profit in the first fiscal year balance sheet. Roma finally fined €60,000 by Criminal Court of Rome for irregularity on youth players transfers only on 30 October 2007. But the chairman of both clubs acquitted the false accounting. And inflate the price and cross-trading itself are not illegal, prosecutor failed to prove the purpose behind is illegal against the clubs.

Parma & loans
Siviglia only played twice for Parma before returned to Atalanta in December 2002 for their Serie A campaign. In August 2003, he left for another Serie A side Lecce, where he partnered with the rising star Cesare Bovo, which also one of the few youth players sold by Roma in 2002 and not a flop. Both players was spotted and shined again, which Siviglia joined Lazio on loan.

Lazio

2004–05
Although aged 31, Siviglia started to play as a regular for a big club, as Lazio only had Fernando Couto, Paolo Negro and Massimo Oddo remained and Jaap Stam, Siniša Mihajlović and Giuseppe Favalli had left the club. He played 29 league matches that season, and 4 2004–05 UEFA Cup matches, 3 as starting XI, out of possible 6.

2005–06
On 31 August 2005, the loan deal became permanent, cost €610,000 only for Lazio He signed a 3-year contract. Prior to join Lazio, he also played two matches (all at Coppa Italia) for Parma as starter. Later Couto also joined Parma on free transfer.

Siviglia was selected by Delio Rossi along with Cribari as central defender pair and secured sixth place for the club. He only missed a few matches due to injury, likes in round 7. and suspended in round 22 & 23 (after received a red card in round 21). But due to 2006 Italian football scandal, Lazio deducted 30 points in 2005–06 season and 3 points in next season, ruled the biancocelesti out of European competition.

2006–07
In 2006–07 season, Lazio finished 3rd (due to Fiorentina deducted 15 points and finished 6th), marked the return to UEFA Champions League. That season, Siviglia played 32 Serie A matches, 31 as starter and sent off 2 times and thus suspended twice (round 19, 37 & 38). He was also injured due to a muscle injury in his left thigh and missed the round 28 match.

2007–08
At the start of 2007–08 season, he was injured in a friendly match But he was also offered a new contract which last until June 2010. After he played the first league match of the season on 23 October as starter, he suffered complained of pain and did a surgery. On 25 November, he returned to squad and played 90+ minutes against his former club Parma. 3 days later, on 28 November, he played his first UEFA Champions League match and the second in his career, against Olympiakos, the match lost 1–2 at home. He then only missed round 18 and 36 due to suspension, and rested against Parma on round 34. He also played the last group stage match against Real Madrid after they lost to Olympiacos. He was not call-up to the match before the Coppa Italia semi-final but played the full match on 7 May the 0–2 lost to Internazionale at the Cup. After that match, his season was pre-mature and not call-up to round 37 due to injury and not call-up to the last match against Napoli as Lazio certainly not qualify to European competition as 7 points away from the eighth team Napoli who qualified to 2008 UEFA Intertoto Cup.

2008–09
As one of the most experienced players in the squad, Siviglia has deputized as captain on many occasions and before the start of the 2008–09 season, was selected as vice-captain behind Tommaso Rocchi and Cristian Ledesma.

He missed 2 months again since November 2008 due to injury He returned to squad on 22 January 2010 against Torino at Coppa Italia. He then missed round 23 after received his fourth yellow card of the season. He played for Lazio at 2009 Coppa Italia Final as starter, which Lazio won Sampdoria after penalty shootout, and was Siviglia's first major honour. As Lazio qualified for next season UEFA Europa League, he was rested again for round 37, and suspended for round 36 due to receive another 4 yellow cards.

2009–10
Siviglia started the 2009–10 season by winning Internazionale at 2009 Supercoppa Italiana. As he had only 1-year contract left with Lazio and aged 36, he became less active as starting XI partially due to injury and the coach failed to fine the best central pair. Siviglia and Cribari at first were the starting central back under the new coach Davide Ballardini. He played both legs of UEFA Europa League play-off round but replaced by Aleksandar Kolarov in the 23 minutes on 27 August 2009. He was suffered muscle problem.

Siviglia returned on 12 September against Juventus, partnered with Modibo Diakité and lost 0–2. In the next match, the opening match of Europa League group stage, the coach preferred Diakité and Cribari, then Siviglia partnered with Diakité again in Serie A round 4. In the next match (round 5), in although he was the starter, he was replaced by Cribari in the 35th minute, again due to injury.

Siviglia returned in round 8 against Sampdoria but unusual as right back and Cribari-Diakité were the starting pair. He then call-up to the match against Villarreal, but Siviglia did not have a place in the final squad, as the coach preferred Ștefan Radu partnered with Cribari and Diakité was the only central back at the bench.

Co-currently with Lazio struggle to win, the starting line-up was unstable. Siviglia was not call-up to the match against Bari in round 9, but returned in round 10, this time partnered with Radu in although Cribari and Diakitè also received call-up. But the experiment of Ballardini failed again, lost to Cagliari 0–1, the experiment continued in next match, a 1–1 draw with Siena in round 11. 4 days later he traveled to Spain for the European match against Villarreal, which he partnered with Diakite again and Radu moved back to fullback position, but he was substituted at half-time with Mauro Zárate in order strength the attack. Ultimately Lazio lost 1–4. Ballardini resumed the experimental Siviglia-Radu pair and the coach dislike Cribari who often collect caution, but the team lost again to Milan in round 12. Siviglia then injured again.

On 6 December Siviglia returned to play as an unused bench at Derby della Capitale (round 15). In the next match, Siviglia formed 3 men defender along with Radu and Guglielmo Stendardo in a 352 formation and finally a second win of the league and the first for Siviglia against Genoa from the front of table on 13 December (round 16). Then Lazio gave up the next European match and filled with backup player. 3 days after the European match, Siviglia played as one of the 3-men defense again at the 0–1 lost to Inter on 20 December (round 17). Siviglia also secured a place in 3-men defense in the next 2 matches, including the third league won against Livorno. Since the arrival of new coach Edoardo Reja, he did not play the first match under Reja against Palermo at Coppa Italia, but returned as one of the 3-men defense in the next match (round 20). After played as unused sub against at Coppa Italia, He played as starting central-back partnered with Stendardo (in 433 formation), against Chievo which both struggle to secure point to stay.

After that match (round 21), he was out-favoured by the coach and returned as starting XI in round 26, partnered with Stendardo and ended in 1–1 draw with Fiorentina. In the next 2 matches 352 was re-introduced and Siviglia had played as starter, both Lazio lost.

but in mid-March, he suffered muscle problem again, and recalled on 3 April. Siviglia returned to the field on 25 April, replaced Simone Del Nero in the last minute.

On 15 May the last match of the season, Siviglia returned to starting XI, with new experimental partners André Dias and Giuseppe Biava in their 352 formation. Before the match both team secured a place in next season Serie A and Lazio won Udinese 3–1.

Coaching career
On 12 July 2016, Siviglia was hired as the coach of the Under-19 squad of Serie B club Ternana. On 11 August 2016, Christian Panucci, who was hired as the head coach for the senior squad of Ternana earlier that summer, was fired by the club after one game in charge. On 12 August, Siviglia was appointed a temporary head coach. On 13 August, Siviglia coached Ternana in a Coppa Italia game against Cesena, a 0–2 loss. On 14 August, a new permanent coach Benito Carbone was hired and Siviglia moved back to the Under-19 squad.

In July 2021, he was appointed head coach of Serie C club Carpi. However, Carpi was not allowed to enter the 2021–22 Serie C season for financial reasons, and a different Carpi-based club called Athletic Carpi was entered into Serie D, with Siviglia not involved in the new club.

On 13 June 2022, Siviglia was unveiled as the new head coach of Serie C club Potenza. On 24 October 2022, he was dismissed following a negative start in the club's 2022–23 Serie C campaign.

Career statistics

1 Included 1 appearance at Supercoppa Italiana

Honours

Club
Roma
 Supercoppa Italiana (1): 2001

Lazio
 Coppa Italia (1): 2008–09
 Supercoppa Italiana (1): 2009

Nocerina
 Serie C2 (1): 1994–95

References

External links

 
 Profile at AIC.Football.it  
 Profile at La Gazzetta dello Sport 2006–07  
 Profile at La Gazzetta dello Sport 2007–08  
 
 
 

1973 births
A.S.G. Nocerina players
A.S. Roma players
Association football central defenders
Atalanta B.C. players
Hellas Verona F.C. players
Italian footballers
Living people
Parma Calcio 1913 players
Sportspeople from the Metropolitan City of Reggio Calabria
S.S. Lazio players
Serie A players
Serie B players
Serie C players
U.S. Lecce players
Italian football managers
Ternana Calcio managers
A.C. Carpi managers
Footballers from Calabria